Every may refer to:

People
 Every (surname), including a list of people surnamed Every or Van Every
 Every Maclean, New Zealand politician in sunda 19th century 
 Every baronets, a title in the Baronetage of England

Other
 Suzuki Every, a kei truck produced by Japanese automaker Suzuki
every, one of the English determiners

See also
 Universal quantification, in predicate logic

Each (disambiguation)
Everybody (disambiguation)
Everyone (disambiguation)
Everything (disambiguation)